Exserohilum oryzinum is a species of fungus in the family Pleosporaceae. Found in Egypt, where it grows on Oryza plants, it was described as new to science in 1984. It is distinguished from other Exserohilum by its distinctly curved to sigmoid ("S"-shaped) conidia.

References

External links

Fungi described in 1984
Pleosporaceae
Fungi of Africa